The Italian X Army Corps was a formation of the Italian army in World War II.

History 
The Corps fought in Northern Africa and took part in the Western Desert Campaign until it was destroyed in the Second Battle of El Alamein in November 1942.
From 22 October to 4 November 1942, British attacks destroyed its three dependent divisions (Brescia, Folgore and Pavia). 
On November 5, the remnants of the Corps retreated in the direction of Fuka, where the last units were captured on the morning of 7 November. 

The X Army Corps was dissolved in December 1942.

Composition

in October 1942 
 17th Infantry Division "Pavia"
 27th Infantry Division "Brescia"
 185th Paratroopers Division "Folgore"

Commanders  
 Generale di Corpo d'armata Alberto Barbieri (10 June 1940 – 4 August 1941)
 Generale di Divisione Luigi Nuvoloni (24 August – 12 December 1941)
 Generale di Corpo d'armata Benvenuto Gioda (13 December 1941 – 16 August 1942)
 Generale di Divisione Federico Ferrari Orsi (17 August – 18 October 1942, KIA)
 Generale di Divisione Enrico Frattini (interim)
 Generale di Divisione Edoardo Nebbia (27 October – 7 November 1942, POW)

Sources 
 Regio Esercito

Army corps of Italy in World War II
Western Desert campaign